Per Magnus Andersson (born 17 May 1966) is a Swedish handball manager and former player who competed in the 1992 Summer Olympics, in the 1996 Summer Olympics and in the 2000 Summer Olympics. He was voted as the best Swedish handballer on four occasions and best handballer in the world in 1993.

In 1992, he was a member of the Swedish handball team that won the silver medal in the Olympic tournament, playing all seven matches and scoring 18 goals. Four years later, he was part of the Swedish team which won the silver medal again, playing six matches and scoring 16 goals. At the 2000 Games, he won his third silver medal with the Swedish team, playing all eight matches and scoring ten goals.

Andersson is the manager of Portuguese side FC Porto since 2018.

External links

1966 births
Living people
Swedish male handball players
Olympic handball players of Sweden
Handball players at the 1992 Summer Olympics
Handball players at the 1996 Summer Olympics
Handball players at the 2000 Summer Olympics
Olympic silver medalists for Sweden
Swedish expatriate sportspeople in Germany
Olympic medalists in handball
Liga ASOBAL players
CB Ademar León players
HK Drott players
Medalists at the 2000 Summer Olympics
Medalists at the 1996 Summer Olympics
Medalists at the 1992 Summer Olympics
Sportspeople from Linköping
20th-century Swedish people